The swimming competition at the 2005 South Pacific Mini Games in Palau was held July 25–30. The venues for the events were:
pool: National Aquatics Center in Meyuns; and 
open water: Palau Pacific Resort Beach.
All pool events were swum in a 6-lane, short-course (25m) pool; the open water events were 5-kilometres in length (5K).

Two notes, related to the organization of the meet:
 Swimmers who were to compete at the 2005 World Championships, were not allowed to swim in the Mini Games (although the competitions were at the same time).
 Full medals were only given out in events with five or more entrants. If an event had four entrants, only the gold and silver medals were award; if an event had only two or three entrants, only the gold medal. Events with fewer than three medals  awarded are noted under the event name.

Event schedule

''Note: This is the same event order as the 2003 South Pacific Games and 2007 South Pacific Games. However, the pool competition is 1 day shorter, which is accomplished by having eight events per day on the first four pool days, rather than six.

Results

Men

Women

Participating countries
57 swimmers from 8 countries were entered in the swimming events at the 2005 Mini Games. Countries with swimmers present were: 

 (2)
 (2)
 (10)
 (1)
 (15)
 (11)
 (10)
 (6)

References

External links
2005 South Pacific Games — Swimming webpage; retrieved 2009-08-14.

2005 in swimming
Swimming at the Pacific Games
2005 South Pacific Mini Games